Pimlico station could refer to one of a number of stations serving the Pimlico area of central London:

 Pimlico tube station
 Pimlico railway station – a mainline station closed in 1911 better known as Grosvenor Road railway station